According to the data given by the United Nations Office on Drugs and Crime, worldwide, 78.7% of homicide victims are men, and in 193 of the 202 listed countries or regions, men were more likely to be killed than women. In two, the ratio was 50:50 (Switzerland and British Virgin Islands), and in the remaining seven – Tonga, Iceland, Japan, New Zealand, South Korea, Latvia, and Hong Kong – women were slightly more likely to be victims of homicides compared to males. A 2000 global study on homicide by the United Nations Office on Drugs and Crime found that men accounted for about 98 percent of all homicide perpetrators worldwide and 79% of the victims (see the chart below).

Rate: The homicide rate is per year per 100,000 inhabitants.

References

Gender and crime
Homicide statistics